Adoni Assembly constituency is a constituency of the Andhra Pradesh Legislative Assembly, India. It is one of 14 constituencies in the Kurnool district. Y Sai Prasad Reddy  is the present MLA of the constituency, who won the 2019 Andhra Pradesh Legislative Assembly election from YSRCP Party.

Y Sai Prasad Reddy of YSRCP Party is currently representing the constituency.

Overview 
It is part of the Kurnool Lok Sabha constituency along with another six Vidhan Sabha segments, namely, Kurnool, Kodumur, Pattikonda, Mantralayam, Yemmiganur and Alur in Kurnool district.

Mandals

Members of Legislative Assembly

Election results

Assembly Elections 2004

Assembly Elections 2009

Assembly elections 2014

Assembly elections 1952

See also 
 List of constituencies of Andhra Pradesh Legislative Assembly

References 

Assembly constituencies of Andhra Pradesh